1995 in Korea may refer to:
1995 in North Korea
1995 in South Korea